Miroslava Syllabová (born 5 September 1990) is a Slovak swimmer. She was born in Levice. She competed in the women's 50m freestyle at the 2012 Summer Olympics in London, finishing with a time of 26.07 seconds in 38th place in the heats.

References

External links

1990 births
Living people
People from Levice
Sportspeople from the Nitra Region
Slovak female swimmers
Olympic swimmers of Slovakia
Swimmers at the 2012 Summer Olympics
20th-century Slovak women
21st-century Slovak women